Thomas Verner Moore (1818-1871) was a Reformed theologian and Presbyterian minister in the Presbyterian Church in the United States (PCUS) who served as Moderator of the General Assembly of the PCUS Southern Presbyterian Church in 1867.

Life
T.V. Moore was born in 1818 and became a minister in the Southern Presbyterian church.  He served in Pennsylvania (1845-47), Richmond, Virginia (1847-68), and Nashville, Tennessee (1869-71).  He was an author and received his D.D. in 1853.

He was the editor and a publisher of The Central Presbyterian.

The PCUS was formed by secession from the Presbyterian Church in the United States of America in 1861 as a result of the American Civil War.  After the end of the civil war in 1865, Dr Moore was appointed Moderator of its General Assembly in 1867.

He died in 1871.

Publications
1856 The Prophets of the Restoration, or, Haggai, Zechariah, and Malachi: A New Translation, with Notes. Rev. T.V. Moore, D.D. Pastor of the First Presbyterian Church, Richmond, Va. Robert Carter and Brothers, New York.
1858 The Last Days of Jesus; or, The appearances of our Lord during the forty days between the resurrection and the ascension. T.V. Moore, Presbyterian Board of Publication, Philadelphia.
1868 The corporate life of the church, preached at the opening of the General Assembly of the Presbyterian Church in the United States, in Franklin Street Church, Baltimore on 21/5/1868.
1868 The Culdee Church: or, The historical connection of modern Presbyterian churches with those of apostolic times, through the Church of Scotland.  Presbyterian Committee of Publication, Richmond, 1868, reprinted from the Central Presbyterian. 
 Harold B. Prince, 1983, pp. 227-229, entries 1452, 2345-2364, 3169, 3892 about T.V. Moore.

References

17th-century Calvinist and Reformed theologians
American Presbyterian ministers
17th-century Presbyterian ministers
1818 births
1871 deaths
American Calvinist and Reformed theologians